The 2019 Milwaukee Brewers season was the 50th season for the Brewers in Milwaukee, the 22nd in the National League, and 51st overall. On September 25, the Brewers clinched a playoff spot in back-to-back seasons for the first time since 1982. They were defeated by the eventual World Series champions Washington Nationals in the Wild Card Game.

Season standings

National League Central

National League Wild Card

Record vs. opponents

Roster

Game log

Regular season

|-style=background:#cfc
| 1 || March 28 || Cardinals || 5–4 || Chacín (1–0) || Mikolas (0–1) || Hader (1) || 45,304 || 1–0 || W1
|-style=background:#fbb
| 2 || March 29 || Cardinals || 5–9 || Gant (1–0) || Williams (0–1) || — || 30,157 || 1–1 || L1
|-style=background:#cfc
| 3 || March 30 || Cardinals || 4–2 || Woodruff (1–0) || Hudson (0–1) || Hader (2)
| 36,655 || 2–1 || W1
|-style=background:#cfc
| 4 || March 31 || Cardinals || 5–4 || Barnes (1–0) || Hicks (0–1) || — || 35,042 || 3–1 || W2
|-

|-style=background:#cfc
| 5 || April 1 || @ Reds || 4–3 || Wilson (1–0) || Iglesias (0–1) || Hader (3) || 7,799 || 4–1 || W3
|-style=background:#cfc
| 6 || April 2 || @ Reds || 4–3 || Chacín (2–0) || Duke (1–1) || Hader (4) || 10,195 || 5–1 || W4
|-style=background:#cfc
| 7 || April 3 || @ Reds || 1–0 || Peralta (1–0) || Castillo (0–1) || Wilson (1) || 13,439 || 6–1 || W5
|-style=background:#cfc
| 8 || April 5 || Cubs || 13–10 || Anderson (1–0) || Quintana (0–1) || — || 34,926 || 7–1 || W6
|-style=background:#fcc
| 9 || April 6 || Cubs || 8–14 || Hamels (1–0) || Burnes (0–1) || — || 42,790 || 7–2 || L1
|-style=background:#cfc
| 10 || April 7 || Cubs || 4–2 || Davies (1–0) || Hendricks (0–2) || Hader (5) || 40,322 || 8–2 || W1
|-style=background:#fcc
| 11 || April 8 || @ Angels || 2–5 || Cahill (1–1) || Chacín (2–1) || Allen (2) || 28,571 || 8–3 || L1
|-style=background:#fcc
| 12 || April 9 || @ Angels || 8–11 || Bedrosian (1–0) || Claudio (0–1) || Allen (3) || 28,793 || 8–4 || L2
|-style=background:#fcc
| 13 || April 10 || @ Angels || 2–4 || Barría (1–0) || Woodruff (1–1) || Robles (1) || 34,446 || 8–5 || L3
|-style=background:#cfc
| 14 || April 12 || @ Dodgers || 8–5 || Albers (1–0) || Urías (0–1) || — || 43,643 || 9–5 || W1
|-style=background:#cfc
| 15 || April 13 || @ Dodgers || 4–1 || Davies (2–0) || Ferguson (0–1) || Guerra (1) || 53,922 || 10–5 || W2
|-style=background:#fcc
| 16 || April 14 || @ Dodgers || 1–7 || Stripling (1–1) || Chacín (2–2) || — || 45,235 || 10–6 || L1
|-style=background:#cfc
| 17 || April 15 || Cardinals || 10–7 || Guerra (1–0) || Mayers (0–1) || — || 28,199 || 11–6 || W1
|-style=background:#cfc
| 18 || April 16 || Cardinals || 8–4 || Woodruff (2–1) || Flaherty (1–1) || — || 30,260 || 12–6 || W1
|-style=background:#fcc
| 19 || April 17 || Cardinals || 3–6 || Wacha (1–0) || Burnes (0–2) || Hicks (4) || 29,817 || 12–7 || L1
|-style=background:#fcc
| 20 || April 18 || Dodgers || 1–3 || Urías (1–1) || Albers (1–1) || Jansen (6) || 33,281 || 12–8 || L2
|-style=background:#fcc
| 21 || April 19 || Dodgers || 3–5 || Báez (1–1) || Hader (0–1) || Jansen (7) || 36,776 || 12–9 || L3
|-style=background:#cfc
| 22 || April 20 || Dodgers || 5–0 || Anderson (2–0) || Ryu (2–1) || — || 40,402 || 13–9 || W1
|-style=background:#fcc
| 23 || April 21 || Dodgers || 5–6 || Jansen (2–0) || Hader (0–2) || — || 32,054 || 13–10 || L1
|-style=background:#fcc
| 24 || April 22 || @ Cardinals || 5–13 || Flaherty (2–1) || Houser (0–1) || — || 35,819 || 13–11 || L2
|-style=background:#fcc
| 25 || April 23 || @ Cardinals || 3–4 || Miller (1–1) || Wilson (1–1) || Hicks (6) || 38,474 || 13–12 || L3
|-style=background:#fcc
| 26 || April 24 || @ Cardinals || 2–5 || Wainwright (2–2) || Chacín (2–3) || Hicks (7) || 36,878 || 13–13 || L4
|-style=background:#cfc
| 27 || April 26 || @ Mets || 10–2 || Albers (2–1) || deGrom (2–3) || — || 28,131 || 14–13 || W1
|-style=background:#cfc
| 28 || April 27 || @ Mets || 8–6 || Woodruff (3–1) || Syndergaard (1–3) || Hader (6) || 40,610 || 15–13 || W2
|-style=background:#fcc
| 29 || April 28 || @ Mets || 2–5 || Matz (3–1) || Barnes (1–1) || Díaz (8) || 25,756 || 15–14 || L1
|-style=background:#cfc
| 30 || April 29 || Rockies || 5–1 || Davies (3–0) || Freeland (2–4) || — || 25,356 || 16–14 || W1
|-style=background:#cfc
| 31 || April 30 || Rockies || 4–3 || Chacín (3–3) || Márquez (3–2) || Hader (7) || 25,673 || 17–14 || W2
|-

|-style=background:#fcc
| 32 || May 1 || Rockies || 4–11 || Estévez (1–0) || Burnes (0–3) || — || 28,780 || 17–15 || L1
|-style=background:#fcc
| 33 || May 2 || Rockies || 6–11 || Gray (3–3) || Peralta (1–1) || — || 21,319 || 17–16 || L2
|-style=background:#cfc
| 34 || May 3 || Mets || 3–1 || Woodruff (4–1) || Matz (3–2) || Hader (8) || 32,550 || 18–16 || W1
|-style=background:#cfc
| 35 || May 4 || Mets || 4–3 (18) || Williams (1–1) || Flexen (0–2) || — || 39,565 || 19–16 || W2
|-style=background:#cfc
| 36 || May 5 || Mets || 3–2 || Davies (4–0) || Vargas (1–2) || Hader (9) || 36,016 || 20–16 || W3
|-style=background:#cfc
| 37 || May 6 || Nationals || 5–3 || Claudio (1–1) || Jennings (0–2) || Guerra (2) || 29,299 || 21–16 || W4
|-style=background:#cfc
| 38 || May 7 || Nationals || 6–0 || Peralta (2–1) || Strasburg (3–2) || — || 31,023 || 22–16 || W5
|-style=background:#cfc
| 39 || May 8 || Nationals || 7–3 || Woodruff (5–1) || Hellickson (2–1) || Hader (10) || 30,333 || 23–16 || W6
|-style=background:#cfc
| 40 || May 10 || @ Cubs || 7–0 || González (1–0) || Quintana (4–2) || — || 37,870 || 24–16 || W7
|-style=background:#fcc
| 41 || May 11 || @ Cubs || 1–2 (15) || Chatwood (2–0) || Smith (0–1) || — || 39,598 || 24–17 || L1
|-style=background:#fcc
| 42 || May 12 || @ Cubs || 1–4 || Lester (3–1) || Chacín (3–4) || Cishek (2) || 37,267 || 24–18 || L2
|-style=background:#fcc
| 43 || May 13 || @ Phillies || 4–7 || Morgan (2–1) || Albers (2–2) || Neshek (2) || 26,169 || 24–19 || L3
|-style=background:#cfc
| 44 || May 14 || @ Phillies || 6–1 || Woodruff (6–1) || Eickhoff (2–2) || — || 31,533 || 25–19 || W1
|-style=background:#cfc
| 45 || May 15 || @ Phillies || 5–2 || González (2–0) || Arrieta (4–4) || Hader (11) || 28,129 || 26–19 || W2
|-style=background:#cfc
| 46 || May 16 || @ Phillies || 11–3 || Davies (5–0) || Eflin (5–4) || — || 38,346 || 27–19 || W3
|-style=background:#fcc
| 47 || May 17 || @ Braves || 8–12 || Fried (6–2) || Chacín (3–5) || Jackson (6) || 36,222 || 27–20 || L1
|-style=background:#fcc
| 48 || May 18 || @ Braves || 3–4 (10) || Webb (2–0) || Hader (0–3) || — || 39,121 || 27–21 || L2
|-style=background:#cfc
| 49 || May 19 || @ Braves || 3–2 (10) || Hader (1–3) || Parsons (1–2) || — || 36,548 || 28–21 || W1
|-style=background:#fcc
| 50 || May 21 || Reds || 0–3 || Gray (1–4) || González (2–1) || Iglesias (10) || 36,829 || 28–22 || L1
|-style=background:#cfc
| 51 || May 22 || Reds || 11–9 || Guerra (2–0) || Peralta (0–1) || Hader (12) || 35,330 || 29–22 || W1
|-style=background:#fcc
| 52 || May 24 || Phillies || 4–6 || Velasquez (2–2) || Peralta (2–2) || Neris (9) || 40,254 || 29–23 || L1
|-style=background:#fcc
| 53 || May 25 || Phillies || 2–7 || Arrieta (5–4) || Chacín (3–6) || — || 42,475 || 29–24 || L2
|-style=background:#cfc
| 54 || May 26 || Phillies || 9–1 || Woodruff (7–1) || Eflin (5–5) || — || 44,174 || 30–24 || W1
|-style=background:#cfc
| 55 || May 27 || @ Twins || 5–4 || Burnes (1–3) || Rogers (1–1) || Hader (13) || 29,167 || 31–24 || W2
|-style=background:#fcc
| 56 || May 28 || @ Twins || 3–5 || Magill (1–0) || Claudio (1–2) || Harper (1) || 27,120 || 31–25 || L1
|-style=background:#cfc
| 57 || May 30 || @ Pirates || 11–5 || Anderson (3–0) || Musgrove (3–6) || — || 13,059 || 32–25 || W1
|-style=background:#fcc
| 58 || May 31 || @ Pirates || 4–9 || Archer (2–5) || Chacín (3–7) || — || 28,465 || 32–26 || L1
|-

|-style=background:#cfc
| 59 || June 1 || @ Pirates || 12–10 (13) || Houser (1–1) || McRae (0–1) || — || 28,770 || 33–26 || W1
|-style=background:#cfc
| 60 || June 2 || @ Pirates || 4–2 || Davies (6–0) || Lyles (5–3) || Burnes (1) || 19,442 || 34–26 || W2
|-style=background:#fcc
| 61 || June 4 || Marlins || 0–16 || López (4–5) || Anderson (3–1) || — || 25,364 || 34–27 || L1
|-style=background:#fcc
| 62 || June 5 || Marlins || 3–8 || Alcántara (3–5) || Nelson (0–1) || — || 26,615 || 34–28 || L2
|-style=background:#cfc
| 63 || June 6 || Marlins || 5–1 || Peralta (3–2) || Smith (3–4) || Hader (14) || 25,409 || 35–28 || W1
|-style=background:#cfc
| 64 || June 7 || Pirates || 10–4 || Woodruff (8–1) || Davis (0–1) || — || 30,296 || 36–28 || W2
|-style=background:#cfc
| 65 || June 8 || Pirates || 5–3 || Davies (7–0) || Feliz (2–2) || Hader (15) || 40,704 || 37–28 || W3
|-style=background:#cfc
| 66 || June 9 || Pirates || 5–2 || Jeffress (1–0) || Liriano (1–1) || Hader (16) || 45,375 || 38–28 || W4
|-style=background:#fcc
| 67 || June 11 || @ Astros || 8–10 || Peacock (6–3) || Peralta (3–3) || — || 35,928 || 38–29 || L1
|-style=background:#cfc
| 68 || June 12 || @ Astros || 6–3 (14) || Houser (2–1) || Pérez (1–1) || — || 40,032 || 39–29 || W1
|-style=background:#fcc
| 69 || June 14 || @ Giants || 3–5 || Pomeranz (2–6) || Davies (7–1) || Smith (17) || 35,106 || 39–30 || L1
|-style=background:#fcc
| 70 || June 15 || @ Giants || 7–8 || Gott (3–0) || Guerra (2–1) || Smith (18) || 34,560 || 39–31 || L2
|-style=background:#cfc
| 71 || June 16 || @ Giants || 5–3 || Albers (3–2) || Samardzija (3–6) || Hader (17) || 34,603 || 40–31 || W1
|-style=background:#fcc
| 72 || June 17 || @ Padres || 0–2 || Lucchesi (6–4) || Chacín (3–8) || Yates (25) || 24,914 || 40–32 || L1
|-style=background:#fcc
| 73 || June 18 || @ Padres || 1–4 || Allen (1–0) || Woodruff (8–2) || Yates (26) || 29,112 || 40–33 || L2
|-style=background:#fcc
| 74 || June 19 || @ Padres || 7–8 || Reyes (4–0) || Jeffress (1–1) || Stammen (3) || 28,144 || 40–34 || L3
|-style=background:#fcc
| 75 || June 20 || Reds || 1–7 || Roark (5–6) || Nelson (0–2) || — || 28,898 || 40–35 || L4
|-style=background:#fcc
| 76 || June 21 || Reds || 7–11 || Hernandez (2–3) || Anderson (3–2) || — || 38,289 || 40–36 || L5
|-style=background:#cfc
| 77 || June 22 || Reds || 6–5 || Albers (4–2) || Castillo (7–2) || Hader (18) || 43,971 || 41–36 || W1
|-style=background:#cfc
| 78 || June 23 || Reds || 7–5 || Woodruff (9–2) || DeSclafani (4–4) || — || 41,237 || 42–36 || W2
|-style=background:#fcc
| 79 || June 25 || Mariners || 3–8 || Gonzales (9–6) || Davies (7–2) || — || 28,468 || 42–37 || L1
|-style=background:#fcc
| 80 || June 26 || Mariners || 2–4 || LeBlanc (5–2) || Houser (2–2) || Elías (10) || 30,074 || 42–38 || L2
|-style=background:#cfc
| 81 || June 27 || Mariners || 4–2 || Anderson (4–2) || Leake (7–7) || Hader (19) || 36,587 || 43–38 || W1
|-style=background:#fcc
| 82 || June 28 || Pirates || 2–3 || Vázquez (2–0) || Jeffress (1–2) || — || 33,931 || 43–39 || L1
|-style=background:#cfc
| 83 || June 29 || Pirates || 3–1 || Woodruff (10–2) || Lyles (5–4) || Hader (20) || 37,821 || 44–39 || W1
|-style=background:#cfc
| 84 || June 30 || Pirates || 2–1 || Jeffress (2–2) || Crick (3–4) || Albers (1) || 41,257 || 45–39 || W2
|-

|-style=background:#cfc
| 85 || July 1 || @ Reds || 8–6 || Claudio (2–2) || Hernandez (2–4) || Jeffress (1) || 16,186 || 46–39 || W3
|-style=background:#fcc
| 86 || July 2 || @ Reds || 4–5 (11) || Iglesias (2–7) || Burnes (1–4) || — || 15,105 || 46–40 || L1
|-style=background:#fcc
| 87 || July 3 || @ Reds || 0–3 || Gray (5–5) || Chacín (3–9) || Iglesias (15) || 22,685 || 46–41 || L2
|-style=background:#fcc
| 88 || July 4 || @ Reds || 0–1 || Castillo (8–3) || Woodruff (10–3) || Iglesias (16) || 20,885 || 46–42 || L3
|-style=background:#cfc
| 89 || July 5 || @ Pirates || 7–6 (10) || Guerra (3–1) || Vázquez (2–1) || — || 23,229 || 47–42 || W1
|-style=background:#fcc
| 90 || July 6 || @ Pirates || 2–12 || Agrazal (2–0) || Houser (2–3) || — || 28,038 || 47–43 || L1
|-style=background:#fcc
| 91 || July 7 || @ Pirates || 5–6 || Liriano (3–1) || Guerra (3–2) || Vázquez (20) || 17,624 || 47–44 || L2
|-style=background:#bcf
| ASG || July 9 || NL @ AL || 3–4 || Tanaka (1–0) || Kershaw (0–1) || Chapman (1) || 36,747 || — || N/A
|-style=background:#fcc
| 92 || July 12 || Giants || 7–10  || Smith (2–0) || Albers (4–3) || — || 40,186 || 47–45 || L3
|-style=background:#cfc
| 93 || July 13 || Giants || 5–4 || Jeffress (3–2) || Moronta (3–5) || — || 42,324 || 48–45 || W1
|-style=background:#fcc
| 94 || July 14 || Giants || 3–8 || Beede (3–3) || Burnes (1–5) || — || 43,258 || 48–46 || L1
|-style=background:#fcc
| 95 || July 15 || Braves || 2–4 || Fried (10–4) || Houser (2–4) || Jackson (17) || 31,850 || 48–47 || L2
|-style=background:#cfc
| 96 || July 16 || Braves || 13–1 || Woodruff (11–3) || Wilson (1–1) || — || 31,599 || 49–47 || W1
|-style=background:#cfc
| 97 || July 17 || Braves || 5–4 || Anderson (5–2) || Keuchel (3–3) || Hader (21) || 36,928 || 50–47 || W2
|-style=background:#cfc
| 98 || July 18 || @ Diamondbacks || 5–1 || Davies (8–2) || López (1–3) || — || 23,985 || 51–47 || W3
|-style=background:#fcc
| 99 || July 19 || @ Diamondbacks || 7–10 || Bradley (3–4) || Chacín (3–10) || Holland (16) || 28,505 || 51–48 || L1
|-style=background:#cfc
| 100 || July 20 || @ Diamondbacks || 8–3 || Houser (3–4) || Chafin (0–2) || — || 38,567 || 52–48 || W1
|-style=background:#cfc
| 101 || July 21 || @ Diamondbacks || 7–4 || Peralta (4–3) || López (1–4) || Hader (22) || 33,111 || 53–48 || W2
|-style=background:#fcc
| 102 || July 22 || Reds || 5–6 || Peralta (1–1) || Jeffress (3–3) || Hughes (1) || 26,235 || 53–49 || L1
|-style=background:#fcc
| 103 || July 23 || Reds || 6–14 || Roark (6–6) || Davies (8–3) || Romano (1) || 33,512 || 53–50 || L2
|-style=background:#cfc
| 104 || July 24 || Reds || 5–4 || Albers (5–3) || Sims (1–1) || Peralta (1) || 39,682 || 54–50 || W1
|-style=background:#cfc
| 105 || July 26 || Cubs || 3–2 || Houser (4–4) || Kintzler (2–1) || Hader (23) || 40,566 || 55–50 || W2
|-style=background:#cfc
| 106 || July 27 || Cubs || 5–3 (10) || Peralta (5–3) || Kimbrel (0–2) || — || 43,931 || 56–50 || W3
|-style=background:#fcc
| 107 || July 28 || Cubs || 4–11 || Brach (4–3) || Davies (8–4) || — || 43,544 || 56–51 || L1
|-style=background:#fcc
| 108 || July 30 || @ Athletics || 2–3  || Treinen (5–3) || Hader (1–4) || — || 17,291 || 56–52 || L2
|-style=background:#cfc
| 109 || July 31 || @ Athletics || 4–2 || Lyles (6–7) || Anderson (9–7) || Hader (24) || 14,864 || 57–52 || W1
|-

|-style=background:#fcc
| 110 || August 1 || @ Athletics || 3–5 || Treinen (6–3) || Hader (1–5) || Hendriks (10) || 17,029 || 57–53 || L1
|-style=background:#fcc
| 111 || August 2 || @ Cubs || 2–6 || Quintana (9–7) || Davies (8–5) || — || 41,424 || 57–54 || L2
|-style=background:#fcc
| 112 || August 3 || @ Cubs || 1–4 || Wick (1–0) || Guerra (3–3) || Kimbrel (9) || 41,186 || 57–55 || L3
|-style=background:#fcc
| 113 || August 4 || @ Cubs || 2–7 || Darvish (4–5) || Houser (4–5) || Chatwood (2) || 40,466 || 57–56 || L4
|-style=background:#cfc
| 114 || August 5 || @ Pirates || 9–7 || Lyles (7–7) || Agrazal (2-3) || Hader (25) || 11,208 || 58–56 || W1
|-style=background:#cfc
| 115 || August 6 || @ Pirates || 4–3 || Guerra (4–3) || Liriano (4–3) || Albers (2) || 13,969 || 59–56 || W2
|-style=background:#cfc
| 116 || August 7 || @ Pirates || 8–3 || Guerra (5–3) || Williams (4–5) || — || 12,885 || 60–56 || W3
|-style=background:#cfc
| 117 || August 9 || Rangers || 6–5 || Hader (2–5) || Clase (0–1) || — || 35,294 || 61–56 || W4
|-style=background:#cfc
| 118 || August 10 || Rangers || 3–2 || Houser (5–5) || Payano (1–1) || Albers (3) || 41,903 || 62–56 || W5
|-style=background:#fcc
| 119 || August 11 || Rangers || 0–1 || Minor (11–6) || Lyles (7–8) || Leclerc (8) || 44,411 || 62–57 || L1
|-style=background:#fcc
| 120 || August 13 || Twins || 5–7 || Duffey (2–1) || Pomeranz (2–10) || Romo (19) || 44,331 || 62–58 || L2
|-style=background:#cfc
| 121 || August 14 || Twins || 6–5 || Guerra (6–3) || Romo (2–1) || Albers (4) || 41,077 || 63–58 || W1
|-style=background:#fcc
| 122 || August 16 || @ Nationals || 1–2 || Strickland (1–1) || Guerra (6–4) || Doolittle (28) || 30,091 || 63–59 || L1
|-style=background:#cfc
| 123 || August 17 || @ Nationals || 15–14 (14) || Guerra (7–4) || Guerra (1–1) || — || 36,953 || 64–59 || W1
|-style=background:#fcc
| 124 || August 18 || @ Nationals || 8–16 || Fedde (4–2) || Anderson (5–3) || — || 30,571 || 64–60 || L1
|-style=background:#fcc
| 125 || August 19 || @ Cardinals || 0–3 || Hudson (12–6) || Davies (8–6) || Miller (5) || 44,843 || 64–61 || L2
|-style=background:#fcc
| 126 || August 20 || @ Cardinals || 4–9 || Webb (1–1) || Jeffress (3–4) || — || 37,823 || 64–62 || L3
|-style=background:#cfc
| 127 || August 21 || @ Cardinals || 5–3 (8) || Houser (6–5) || Wainwright (9–9) || Guerra (3) || 40,250 || 65–62 || W1
|-style=background:#cfc
| 128 || August 23 || Diamondbacks || 6–1 || Lyles (8–8) || Kelly (9–13) || — || 42,209 || 66–62 || W2
|-style=background:#cfc
| 129 || August 24 || Diamondbacks || 4–0 || Anderson (6–3) || Gallen (2–4) || — || 41,737 || 67–62 || W3
|-style=background:#fcc
| 130 || August 25 || Diamondbacks || 2–5 || Ray (11–7) || Davies (8–7) || Bradley (7) || 38,920 || 67–63 || L1
|-style=background:#fcc
| 131 || August 26 || Cardinals || 2–12 || Gant (9–0) || González (2–2) || — || 29,475 || 67–64 || L2
|-style=background:#fcc
| 132 || August 27 || Cardinals || 3–6 || Mikolas (8–13) || Albers (5–4) || Martínez (16) || 36,690 || 67–65 || L3
|-style=background:#cfc
| 133 || August 28 || Cardinals || 4–1 || Lyles (9–8) || Flaherty (8–7) || Hader (26) || 33,045 || 68–65 || W1
|-style=background:#fcc
| 134 || August 30 || @ Cubs || 1–7 || Quintana (12–8) || Anderson (6–4) || — || 40,276 || 68–66 || L1
|-style=background:#cfc
| 135 || August 31 || @ Cubs || 2–0 || Guerra (8–4) || Hamels (7–5) || Hader (27) || 40,178 || 69–66 || W1
|-style=background:#fcc

|-style=background:#cfc
| 136 || September 1 || @ Cubs || 4–0 || Jackson (1–0) || Chatwood (5–3) || — || 40,912 || 70–66 || W2
|-style=background:#fcc
| 137 || September 2 || Astros || 2–3  || Osuna (4–3) || Guerra (8–5) || James (1) || 39,046 || 70–67 || L1
|-style=background:#cfc
| 138 || September 3 || Astros || 4–2 || Lyles (10–8) || Greinke (14–5) || Hader (28) || 29,335 || 71–67 || W1
|-style=background:#fcc
| 139 || September 5 || Cubs || 5–10 || Quintana (13–8) || Albers (5–5) || — || 31,007 || 71–68 || L1
|-style=background:#cfc
| 140 || September 6 || Cubs || 7–1 || Davies (9–7) || Hamels (7–6) || — || 38,139 || 72–68 || W1
|-style=background:#cfc
| 141 || September 7 || Cubs || 3–2 || Hader (3–5) || Kintzler (3–3) || — || 44,323 || 73–68 || W2
|-style=background:#cfc
| 142 || September 8 || Cubs || 8–5 || Suter (1–0) || Lester (12–10) || Hader (29) || 44,217 || 74–68 || W3
|-style=background:#cfc
| 143 || September 9 || @ Marlins || 8–3 || Albers (6–5) || Dugger (0–2) || — || 6,672 || 75–68 || W4
|-style=background:#cfc
| 144 || September 10 || @ Marlins || 4–3 || Guerra (9–5) || Conley (2–9) || Pomeranz (1) || 7,215 || 76–68 || W5
|-style=background:#cfc
| 145 || September 11 || @ Marlins || 7–5 || Suter (2–0) || Ureña (4–9) || Hader (30) || 7,815 || 77–68 || W6
|-style=background:#cfc
| 146 || September 12 || @ Marlins || 3–2 || Peralta (6–3) || Smith (8–10) || Hader (31) || 7,375 || 78–68 || W7
|-style=background:#fcc
| 147 || September 13 || @ Cardinals || 0–10 || Wainwright (12–9) || Houser (6–6) || — || 47,075 || 78–69 || L1
|-style=background:#cfc
| 148 || September 14 || @ Cardinals || 5–2 || Lyles (11–8) || Flaherty (10–8) || Hader (32) || 46,665 || 79–69 || W1
|-style=background:#cfc
| 149 || September 15 || @ Cardinals || 7–6 || Albers (7–5) || Gant (10–1) || Hader (33) || 46,722 || 80–69 || W2
|-style=background:#cfc
| 150 || September 16 || Padres || 5–1 || Davies (10–7) || Richards (0–1) || — || 33,215 || 81–69 || W3
|-style=background:#cfc
| 151 || September 17 || Padres || 3–1 || Albers (8–5) || Strahm (5–9) || Pomeranz (2) || 34,565 || 82–69 || W4
|-style=background:#fcc
| 152 || September 18 || Padres || 1–2 || Lamet (3–5) || Houser (6–7) || Yates (41) || 38,235 || 82–70 || L1
|-style=background:#cfc
| 153 || September 19 || Padres || 5–1 || Peralta (7–3) || Lucchesi (10–9) || Hader (34) || 31,687 || 83–70 || W1
|-style=background:#cfc
| 154 || September 20 || Pirates || 10–1 || Anderson (7–4) || Brault (4–6) || — || 43,390 || 84–70 || W2
|-style=background:#cfc
| 155 || September 21 || Pirates || 10–1 || Suter (3–0) || Marvel (0–3) || — || 42,888 || 85–70 || W3
|-style=background:#cfc
| 156 || September 22 || Pirates || 4–3 || González (3–2) || Williams (7–8) || Hader (35) || 43,321 || 86–70 || W4
|-style=background:#cfc
| 157 || September 24 || @ Reds || 4–2 || Suter (4–0) || Gray (11–8) || Hader (36) || 14,778 || 87–70 || W5
|-style=background:#cfc
| 158 || September 25 || @ Reds || 9–2 || Lyles (12–8) || Mahle (2–12) || — || 16,530 || 88–70 || W6
|-style=background:#cfc
| 159 || September 26 || @ Reds || 5–3 || Anderson (8–4) || Castillo (15–8) || Hader (37) || 27,774 || 89–70 || W7
|-style=background:#fcc
| 160 || September 27 || @ Rockies || 7–11 || Senzatela (11–11) || Black (0–1) || — || 44,087 || 89–71 || L1
|-style=background:#fcc
| 161 || September 28 || @ Rockies || 2–3 (10) || Díaz (6–4) || Albers (8–6) || — || 47,381 || 89–72 || L2
|-style=background:#fcc
| 162 || September 29 || @ Rockies || 3–4 (13) || Shaw (3–2) || Faria (0–1) || — || 36,771 || 89–73 || L3
|-

|- style="text-align:center;"
| Legend:       = Win       = Loss       = PostponementBold = Brewers team member

Postseason Game Log

|-style=background:#fbb
| 1 || October 1 || @ Nationals || 3–4 || Strasburg (1–0) || Hader (0–1) || Hudson (1) || 42,993 || 0–1 || L1 
|-

Postseason rosters

| style="text-align:left" |
Pitchers: 15 Drew Pomeranz 23 Jordan Lyles 25 Jay Jackson 35 Brent Suter 41 Junior Guerra 51 Freddy Peralta 53 Brandon Woodruff 57 Chase Anderson 58 Alex Claudio 71 Josh Hader
Catchers: 9 Manny Piña 10 Yasmani Grandal
Infielders: 3 Orlando Arcia 5 Cory Spangenberg 7 Eric Thames 11 Mike Moustakas 14 Hernán Pérez 18 Keston Hiura 21 Travis Shaw 29 Tyler Austin 
Outfielders: 2 Trent Grisham 6 Lorenzo Cain 8 Ryan Braun 12 Tyrone Taylor 16 Ben Gamel
|- valign="top"

Detailed records

Farm system

The Brewers' farm system consisted of nine minor league affiliates in 2019. They operated a Dominican Summer League team as a co-op with the Cleveland Indians.

References

External links
2019 Milwaukee Brewers season at Baseball Reference
Milwaukee Brewers season Official Site 

Milwaukee Brewers seasons
Milwaukee Brewers
Milwaukee Brewers